Yus Rural LLG is a local-level government (LLG) of Morobe Province, Papua New Guinea.

Wards
01. Yawan Worin
02. Sugan
03. Boksawin
04. Dinangat (Kutong language speakers)
05. Gorgiok
06. Bungawat
07. Mek Nolum
08. Urop Isan
09. Wadabong
10. Nokopo
11. Gua Gangulut
12. Kumbul Taps
13. Mengan Numbo

References

Local-level governments of Morobe Province